Igor Vladimirovich Misko (24 July 1986 – 6 July 2010) was a Russian professional ice hockey player. He played with SKA Saint Petersburg in the Russian Superleague and in the Kontinental Hockey League. He also played for such hockey teams from Saint Petersburg as Izhorets, Lokomotiv and Spartak. He died on 6 July 2010 from cardiac arrest while driving in the Kolpino region of St. Petersburg. He crashed into another car, but was ruled dead from the heart failure.

References

External links

1986 births
2010 deaths
Road incident deaths in Russia
Russian ice hockey left wingers
SKA Saint Petersburg players
Ice hockey people from Saint Petersburg